The 1959–60 Soviet Cup was an association football cup competition of the Soviet Union.

Competition schedule

Preliminary stage

Group 1

Quarterfinals
 [Jul 8] 
 KHIMIK Yaroslavl              4-1  Iskra Kazan 
 Metallurg Dnepropetrovsk      1-2  LOKOMOTIV Saratov 
 TRUD Ryazan                   4-1  Metallurg Zaporozhye        [aet]

Semifinals
 [Jul 3] 
 Trud Voronezh                 1-2  SPARTAK Leningrad   
 TRUDOVIYE REZERVY Lipetsk     3-0  Avangard Nikolayev 
 [Jul 7] 
 DINAMO Kirov                 10-3  Lokomotiv Bendery 
 [Jul 11] 
 Trud Ryazan                   1-1  Khimik Dneprodzerzhinsk  
 [Jul 14] 
 SPARTAK Kherson               2-1  Khimik Yaroslavl            [aet] 
 TORPEDO Vladimir              4-3  Lokomotiv Saratov           [aet]

Semifinals replays
 [Jul 12] 
 TRUD Ryazan                   1-0  Khimik Dneprodzerzhinsk

Final
 [Jul 19] 
 SPARTAK Kherson               1-0  Spartak Leningrad 
 TORPEDO Vladimir              2-1  Trudoviye Rezervy Lipetsk 
 Trud Ryazan                   0-1  DINAMO Kirov

Group 2

Quarterfinals
 [Jul 4] 
 ARSENAL Kiev                  w/o  Spartak Minsk 
 Trudoviye Rezervy Kursk       0-6  KOLHOSPNIK Poltava 
 [Jul 5] 
 Shakhtyor Stalinogorsk        1-2  TRUD Glukhovo

Semifinals
 [Jul 7] 
 AVANGARD Kharkov              5-4  Kolhospnik Poltava          [aet] 
 AVANGARD Zhitomir             3-1  Avangard Krivoi Rog 
 ZNAMYA TRUDA Orekhovo-Zuyevo  3-0  Lokomotiv Gomel 
 [Jul 10] 
 Kolhospnik Cherkassy          0-2  TRUD Glukhovo  
 TRUDOVIYE REZERVY Leningrad   w/o  Zvezda Kirovograd 
 [Aug 6] 
 ARSENAL Kiev                  2-0  Trud Tula

Final
 [Aug 12] 
 ARSENAL Kiev                  2-0  Avangard Zhitomir 
 TRUD Glukhovo                 5-3  Znamya Truda Orekhovo-Zuyevo  [aet] 
 [Aug 19] 
 AVANGARD Kharkov              3-1  Trudoviye Rezervy Leningrad

Group 3

Quarterfinals
 [Jun 23] 
 KUBAN Krasnodar               4-1  Torpedo Taganrog 
 Spartak Nalchik               1-1  Torpedo Kutaisi

Quarterfinals replays
 [Jun 24] 
 SPARTAK Nalchik               5-2  Torpedo Kutaisi

Semifinals
 [Jun 23] 
 SPARTAK Stavropol             3-1  Lokomotiv Tbilisi 
 [Jun 26] 
 ROSTSELMASH Rostov-na-Donu    4-0  Temp Makhachkala 
 NEFTYANIK Baku                3-1  Terek Grozny 
 SHIRAK Leninakan              6-0  Textilshchik Kirovabad 
 SKVO Tbilisi                  3-1  Kuban Krasnodar 
 Spartak Nalchik               1-2  SPARTAK Yerevan

Final
 [Jul 4] 
 Spartak Stavropol             1-2  NEFTYANIK Baku                [aet] 
 [Jul 10] 
 SHIRAK Leninakan              2-0  Spartak Yerevan 
 SKVO Tbilisi                  7-2  RostSelMash Rostov-na-Donu

Group 4

Quarterfinals
 [Jul 3] 
 DINAMO Tallinn                4-0  Urozhai Minsk 
 Kolhospnik Rovno              2-3  SKVO Odessa  
 SKCF Sevastopol               3-1  Avangard Ternopol

Semifinals
 [Jul 13] 
 Daugava Riga                  1-2  SKVO Odessa                 [aet] 
 [Jul 14] 
 Avangard Simferopol           0-3  SPARTAK Stanislav 
 LOKOMOTIV Vinnitsa            3-0  SKCF Sevastopol 
 SKVO Lvov                     2-1  Dinamo Tallinn 
 SPARTAK Vilnius               2-1  Chernomorets Odessa 
 [Aug 3] 
 Baltika Kaliningrad           0-1  SPARTAK Uzhgorod

Final
 [Jul 24] 
 SKVO Lvov                     0-1  SPARTAK Vilnius 
 SKVO Odessa                   6-0  Spartak Stanislav 
 [Aug 24] 
 LOKOMOTIV Vinnitsa            7-1  Spartak Uzhgorod

Group 5

Quarterfinals
 ADMIRALTEYETS Leningrad       3-2  Volga Kalinin 
 SPARTAK Ulyanovsk             3-2  Shakhtyor Gorlovka

Semifinals
 ADMIRALTEYETS Leningrad       4-2  Shakhtyor Kadiyevka 
 ENERGIYA Volzhskiy            4-1  Zenit Izhevsk 
 Lokomotiv Stalino             3-4  TRAKTOR Stalingrad 
 SHAKHTYOR Shakhty             3-0  Raketa Gorkiy 
 SPARTAK Ulyanovsk             3-1  Trudoviye Rezervy Lugansk 
 TEXTILSHCHIK Ivanovo          3-2  Torpedo Gorkiy

Final
ADMIRALTEYETS Leningrad       4-0  Textilshchik Ivanovo 
SHAKHTYOR Shakhty             3-0  Energiya Volzhskiy 
TRAKTOR Stalingrad            4-1  Spartak Ulyanovsk

Group 6

Quarterfinals
 HOSILOT Stalinabad            2-1  Spartak Frunze 
 KAYRAT Alma-Ata               1-0  Metallurg Magnitogorsk 
 LOKOMOTIV Chelyabinsk         w/o  Trudoviye Rezervy Tashkent 
 Metallurg Nizhniy Tagil       0-1  MASHINOSTROITEL Sverdlovsk 
 STROITEL Ufa                  w/o  Pahtakor Tashkent 
 ZVEZDA Perm                   5-1  Shakhtyor Karaganda

Semifinals
 [Jul 9] 
 KAYRAT Alma-Ata               w/o  Hosilot Stalinabad 
 PAMIR Leninabad               w/o  Mashinostroitel Sverdlovsk 
 STROITEL Ufa                  4-1  Kolhozchi Ashkhabad 
 ZVEZDA Perm                   2-0  Lokomotiv Chelyabinsk

Final
 [Jul 19] 
 Kayrat Alma-Ata               1-2  STROITEL Ufa 
 ZVEZDA Perm                   2-1  Pamir Leninabad

Group 7

Quarterfinals
 [May 20] 
 Metallurg Stalinsk            1-3  SKVO Chita 
 [Jul 9] 
 SIBSELMASH Novosibirsk        w/o  SKVO Sverdlovsk

Semifinals
 [Jun 13] 
 UROZHAI Barnaul               w/o  Lokomotiv Ulan-Ude 
 SKVO Chita                    2-2  Luch Vladivostok  
 [Jun 25] 
 SKVO Khabarovsk               0-1  ENERGIYA Irkutsk 
 [Jul 7] 
 Khimik Kemerovo               1-4  LOKOMOTIV Krasnoyarsk  
 SIBELECTROMOTOR Tomsk         4-1  Irtysh Omsk 
 [Jul 15] 
 LOKOMOTIV Komsomolsk-na-Amure 1-0  SibSelMash Novosibirsk

Semifinals replays
 [Jun 14] 
 SKVO Chita                    1-3  LUCH Vladivostok

Final
 [Jul 5] 
 ENERGIYA Irkutsk              2-0  Luch Vladivostok 
 [Jul 21] 
 Lokomotiv Komsomolsk-na-Amure 0-1  SIBELECTROMOTOR Tomsk  
 Urozhai Barnaul               0-1  LOKOMOTIV Krasnoyarsk         [aet]

Final stage

First round
 [Jul 11] 
 Energiya Irkutsk              0-3  SPARTAK Moskva 
   [Yevgeniy Kholmogorov 3, Ivan Mozer 65, Sergei Salnikov 83] 
 [Jul 15] 
 SHIRAK Leninakan              5-0  Krylya Sovetov Kuibyshev 
 [Jul 30] 
 Shakhtyor Shakhty             1-4  MOLDOVA Kishinev 
 [Aug 2] 
 Spartak Kherson               0-2  SHAKHTYOR Stalino 
   [Ivan Boboshko, Ivan Fedosov] 
 [Aug 9] 
 Trud Glukhovo                 1-1  CSK MO Moskva 
   [Andreyev – Viktor Brovkin] 
 [Aug 18] 
 SKVO Tbilisi                  2-0  Zenit Leningrad 
   [Mikadze 55, 86] 
 [Aug 19] 
 Dinamo Kirov                  3-4  DINAMO Tbilisi 
   [V.Yershov-2, V.Ilyin pen – Zaur Kaloyev-2, Toradze, Shota Yamanidze] 
 Lokomotiv Vinnitsa            0-3  SKVO Rostov-na-Donu 
   [Vladimir Smirnov 13, 78, Alexei Levchenko 70] 
 SIBELECTROMOTOR Tomsk         1-0  Dinamo Kiev 
   [N.Kozlov 38 pen] 
 [Aug 25] 
 Torpedo Vladimir              1-2  ADMIRALTEYETS Leningrad 
 [Aug 26] 
 Arsenal Kiev                  0-2  DINAMO Moskva 
   [Genrikh Fedosov 25, 48] 
 Lokomotiv Krasnoyarsk         2-4  TORPEDO Moskva 
   [Yuriy Agiyenko 37, 38 – Yuriy Falin 2, ?, Valentin Ivanov 44, ?] 
 SPARTAK Vilnius               4-3  Zvezda Perm 
   [Kazlauskas-2, Petkevicius, ? – Beloborodov-2, ?] 
 [Sep 22] 
 STROITEL Ufa                  4-2  Avangard Kharkov              [aet] 
   [V.Perevoznikov, Y.Yefimov, Y.Artamonov, V.Kuzmin – Y.Panfilov, A.Mashin] 
 [Oct 21] 
 SKVO Odessa                   3-1  Lokomotiv Moskva 
   [V.Grishin 17, D.Mizerny 88, V.Nazarov 89 – Viktor Sokolov 45] 
 [Oct 25] 
 TRAKTOR Stalingrad            1-0  Neftyanik Baku

First round replays
 [Aug 10] 
 Trud Glukhovo                 1-7  CSK MO Moskva

Second round
 [Aug 17] 
 SHIRAK Leninakan              2-1  Moldova Kishinev 
 [Sep 30] 
 SPARTAK Vilnius               3-1  Admiralteyets Leningrad 
   [Stasis Krocas-2, Stasis Madeikis – Igor Sveshnikov] 
 [Oct 4] 
 SibElectroMotor Tomsk         1-2  TORPEDO Moskva 
   [A.Chentsov 43 – Slava Metreveli 56, 74] 
 [Oct 22] 
 TRAKTOR Stalingrad            4-0  Stroitel Ufa 
   [Telenkov-2, V.Kamenev, Butskiy] 
 [Nov 5] 
 DINAMO Tbilisi                2-1  Spartak Moskva                [aet] 
   [Khochalava 6, Mikhail Meskhi 104 – Sergei Salnikov 9] 
 [Sep 14, 1960] 
 DINAMO Moskva                 1-0  CSKA Moskva 
   [Arkadiy Nikolayev 58] 
 SKA Rostov-na-Donu            0-4  SHAKHTYOR Stalino 
   [Yuriy Ananchenko 21, 36, 38, 63] 
 SKA Tbilisi                   -:+  SKA Odessa 
   [SKA Tbilisi had ceased to be]

Quarterfinals
 [Aug 25] 
 SKA Odessa                    1-0  Traktor Stalingrad 
   [Yuriy Markin 60 og] 
 [Sep 28] 
 DINAMO Tbilisi                5-1  Shirak Leninakan 
   [Zaur Kaloyev-4, Shota Yamanidze – Avetisyan] 
 Spartak Vilnius               1-2  SHAKHTYOR Stalino 
   [Algirdas Kulikauskas 76 – Valentin Sapronov 11, Anatoliy Mironov 30] 
 TORPEDO Moskva                2-0  Dinamo Moskva 
   [Oleg Sergeyev 24, Boris Batanov 64]

Semifinals
 [Oct 26, Moskva] 
 Shakhtyor Stalino             1-2  DINAMO Tbilisi                [aet] 
   [Yuriy Ananchenko 108 – Zaur Kaloyev 100, Mikhail Meskhi 120] 
 [Oct 27]  
 TORPEDO Moskva                4-0  SKA Odessa 
   [Valentin Ivanov-2, Gennadiy Gusarov pen, Slava Metreveli]

Final

External links
 Complete calendar. helmsoccer.narod.ru
 1960 Soviet Cup. Footballfacts.ru
 1960 Soviet football season. RSSSF

Soviet Cup seasons
Cup
Cup
Soviet Cup